Abu Ali Bard, whose birth name is Abdul-Malik Bard, is a Syrian rebel leader and commander of Jaysh al-Thuwar, a Free Syrian Army-aligned group operating as part of the US-backed Syrian Democratic Forces coalition that is largely made up of Kurdish fighters from the People's Protection Units (YPG).

Biography

Background
He had been described as dedicated to the cause of the Syrian opposition, and would carry himself as an "Islamic Mujahid" while also singing traditional Ataaba music and enjoy smoking cigarettes, also criticizing Chechen foreign fighters calling them "Chechen dogs", and participating in several battles against the Syrian government according to activists.

Anti-government activities
Abu Ali Bard is from the town of Taftanaz in the Idlib Governorate in northwestern Syria, he has been described as one of the first civilians to take up arms against the Syrian government led by Bashar al-Assad and joined the Syrian Martyrs' Brigade that was founded by the rebel commander Jamal Maarouf in 2012. From 2012 to 2015 he took part in several battles alongside rebel forces including the al-Nusra Front, in 2013 he became a member of the Syrian Revolutionaries Front led by Maarouf and was made head of the group's special forces unit.

Jaysh al-Thuwar
In an interview explaining why he decided to join the Syrian Democratic Forces, he said it was after the battles in Kobani and in Tel Abyad that he was impressed with the military unity and organization among the groups that took part in those battles that went on to form SDF, in comparison to the disunity and infighting among the rest of the rebels.

After the formation of Jaysh al-Thuwar in 2016 he commanded the group in its assault against other rebel groups in northern Aleppo alongside the Kurdish YPG under the then newly formed SDF coalition, taking control of the Menagh Military Airbase that had been held by the rebels since capturing it from the Syrian government in 2013.

In March 2018, in response to the Turkish military and allied rebel groups launching a military operation in Afrin, which at the time was held by the Syrian Democratic Forces, Abu Ali announced that Jaysh al-Thuwar would redeploy fighters from fronts with ISIL to fight Turkey and allied forces in Afrin, saying that the decision was made “at a time of international silence in the face of the barbarism of the Turks against civilians.”

In May 2019, in response to the beginning of a Syrian government offensive backed by Russia and Iran, Jaysh al-Thuwar released a statement saying the group would take part in the defense of Idlib, where Bard originates from and fight against an Iranian-Shiite invasion.

References

Members of the Free Syrian Army
People from Idlib Governorate
Living people
Syrian Muslims
1987 births